Susanna Mildonian (2 July 1940 – 7 October 2022) was a Belgian harpist and educator.

Biography
Born in Venice to an Armenian family, Mildonian studied the harp under Margherita Cicognari at the Conservatorio di Musica Benedetto Marcello di Venezia before continuing her studies at the Conservatoire de Paris under the direction of Pierre Jamet.

Mildonian recorded concertos for the harp with orchestra by Alberto Ginastera and Heitor Villa-Lobos, concertos for two harps with orchestra by François-Joseph Gossec, and concertos for violin and harp with orchestra by Louis Spohr. She translated the piano sonata of Mateo Albéniz into D minor for harp.

In 1971, Mildonian became a harp professor at the Royal Conservatory of Brussels, the Fontys School of Fine and Performing Arts, and Codarts. When she retired in 2004, she donated her collection of approximately 500 scores to the foundation.

Mildonian died in October 2022, at the age of 82.

Awards
First Prize at The International Harp Contest in Israel (1959)
First Prize at the Geneva International Music Competition (1964)
First Prize at the Harp Competition "Marcel Tournier" (1971)

References

External Links
 
 

1940 births
2022 deaths
Belgian harpists
Women harpists
20th-century Belgian musicians
20th-century Belgian women musicians
20th-century classical musicians
21st-century Belgian musicians
21st-century women musicians
21st-century classical musicians
Belgian people of Armenian descent
Belgian music educators
Women music educators
Musicians from Venice
Conservatoire de Paris alumni
Academic staff of the Royal Conservatory of Brussels
Academic staff of Codarts University for the Arts